Stephanie Beth James (born 17 August 1985 in Aberdare, Glamorgan) is a Welsh actress who began her career in 2004, at the age of 19, when she portrayed the role of single mother Leigh-Anne Williams in the feature film "A Way of Life", in which she portrayed a struggling single parent who was at the centre of a storyline featuring a racially motivated murder.
For this role, she was subsequently awarded "Best Actress" award at the Bratislava Film Festival.

She studied Drama and Theatre Studies at Swansea Institute.

Despite positive reviews of her performance in A Way of Life, she has not had any television or film credits in the 14 years since.

External links

Living people
1985 births
Welsh film actresses
Alumni of Swansea Metropolitan University